Today with Hoda & Jenna  (also known as the fourth hour of Today or simply Hoda & Jenna) is an American daytime television talk show on NBC, hosted by Hoda Kotb and Jenna Bush Hager. The program airs as the fourth hour of NBC's Today at 10:00 a.m. in all time zones (subject to local delay) as a "show-within-a-show" with its own hosts, opening sequence, theme music, and website. The Monday through Thursday editions of this portion of the program air live in the Eastern Time Zone and on tape delay elsewhere; the Friday edition is pre-recorded.

The program originally began as an expansion of Today, hosted by Ann Curry, Natalie Morales and Hoda Kotb. For 11 years, the program grew as its own distinct entity as Today with Kathie Lee and Hoda, after Kotb was joined by Kathie Lee Gifford on April 7, 2008. On December 11, 2018, Gifford and NBC announced that she would be leaving Today. On February 26, 2019, it was announced that Jenna Bush Hager would be succeeding Gifford as the new co-host.

History

2007–08: Start of the fourth hour
On January 17, 2007, at its press tour sessions, NBC News announced that Today would be expanded to four hours beginning that fall. To make room on its schedule for the expansion, NBC – rather than disrupting an hour of programming time already allocated for syndicated or local programming on its stations – made the decision to cancel the low-rated daytime soap opera Passions and use that hour allocation for the new fourth hour.

The fourth hour debuted on September 10, 2007, originally hosted by Ann Curry, Natalie Morales, and Hoda Kotb.

2008–19: Kathie Lee and Hoda

Kathie Lee Gifford replaced Curry and Morales as co-host on April 7, 2008, and over time became more of its own distinct entity, and was being referred to more as simply Kathie Lee & Hoda, with its own website and social media presence. The fourth hour does not have news or weather segments (other than local newsbreaks aired during the first half-hour on some NBC stations, provided they air the fourth hour at 10:00 a.m.) or input from the earlier hosts and is structured virtually as a standalone talk show, with an opening "host chat" segment reminiscent of the one popularized by Gifford and Regis Philbin on Live! with Regis and Kathie Lee, as well as interviews and features focusing on entertainment, fashion and other topics aimed at female viewers.

Kathie Lee & Hoda competed with ABC's The View and CBS's The Price Is Right in most markets in the Central and Pacific Time Zones, but most stations in the Eastern Time Zone air it live one hour before those programs, as ABC and CBS's late morning daytime programs are not tape delayed for each time zone. Not all NBC affiliates carry Kathie Lee & Hoda live. The program airs on tape delay in some markets that may air it later in the morning or early afternoons at the station's discretion to make room for local news or syndicated programming.

On September 26, 2011, NBC began to rebroadcast Kathie Lee & Hoda as part of its overnight lineup (formerly known as NBC All Night) on weekday early mornings at 2:05 a.m. Eastern and Pacific Time (varied according to local scheduling; although the rebroadcast is pre-empted by NBC affiliates in a few markets, such as those owned by Graham Media Group), as a replacement for Poker After Dark, which was canceled due to legal issues involving that show's sponsor Full Tilt Poker and televised poker in general.

On December 11, 2018, NBC and Gifford announced that she will be retiring from her position of anchoring the fourth hour in April 2019, her 11th anniversary since joining Today. Kotb would continue anchoring the fourth hour.

2019–present: Hoda and Jenna
On February 26, 2019, NBC announced that Jenna Bush Hager would replace Gifford on the fourth hour of Today after her departure on April 5, 2019. The renamed Today with Hoda & Jenna premiered on April 8, 2019. Joanne LaMarca Mathisen, who previously served as senior producer and left in January 2017, returned to NBC to become the new executive producer. Tammy Filler, the executive producer for Kathie Lee and Hoda since July 2017, left Today to become executive vice president and editor-in-chief of E! News.

In the fall of 2019, a number of NBC stations and affiliates also carrying the syndicated NBCUniversal Television Distribution program The Kelly Clarkson Show began to carry a late-night repeat of that show instead of Hoda & Jenna to give the former an additional cumulative ratings boost. Those stations that do not air Kelly or prefer to air it only once per day continued to carry Hoda & Jenna until March 28, 2022, when NBC replaced its late-night rebroadcast of Hoda & Jenna with a rebroadcast of Top Story with Tom Llamas from NBC News Now.

It was revealed on the 2019 Halloween show that Kotb and Hager had only hosted five shows together since the premiere of the revamped hour in April 2019, due to both women being away for parental leave. On the same day, Hager announced she would return on November 11, 2019.

On January 16, 2020, Kotb and Hager announced that the Thursday and Friday editions of Hoda & Jenna would be recorded in front of a live studio audience starting February 6, 2020, and called Hoda & Jenna & Friends. The revamped editions were broadcast from Studio 6A, formerly used by Megyn Kelly Today, instead of Studio 1A. However, the program would later return to Studio 1A due to the COVID-19 pandemic, with another NBC program The Tonight Show Starring Jimmy Fallon moving into Studio 6A.
On October 6, 2021, it was announced that former co-executive producer of The Wendy Williams Show and Tamron Hall, Talia Parkinson-Jones would be named the new executive producer of the show taking the place of LaMarca Mathisen.

Recurring elements
The show's signature element is its opening "host chat" segment where the latest entertainment headlines and stories are discussed. This segment was called Today's Talk during the Kathie Lee and Hoda era of the program, however that name has not been used since Hager joined the program as co-host.

The show is most notable for its frequent use and display of wine on-air. Speaking about the wine, Gifford, in an interview with Variety, said: "People just assume we are drinking wine the whole time, but the reality is most days it just sits there." Gifford has also said that they have a sip once or twice but the wine is used mainly as a prop to be funny.

Segments
The show has had many recurring segments throughout its years. They include:

Current
 Ambush Makeover is a segment on Thursdays where select fans who show up in Rockefeller Plaza get a makeover.
 All Rise for Judge  (Guest's name) is a game where they ask a guest their argument on a few topics.
 Chooseday is a segment on Tuesdays where viewers vote from a selection of three outfits each for Hoda & Jenna to wear the next day on the show.
 Hoda & Jenna's Relationship Dilemmas is a segment where they give relationship advice to viewer's questions.
iHoda Live, which succeeds the original iHoda, is a segment where Hoda brings in the artist of her favorite song of the moment to perform live. Joshua Radin was the first to perform.
Read With Jenna is a monthly on-air book discussion club in the style of Oprah's Book Club.  The segment started in March 2019 when Hager chose the book The Last Romantics by Tara Conklin.  Due to the size of the Today Show's audience, most of the books chosen by her have become instant best-sellers.
The Scoop is a segment where they talk about the latest celebrity news and gossip. At the end of the year, they do a special year-in-review version called The Scoopies.
Weekend Watchlist is a segment that provides movie and TV recommendations to binge.

Former
Friday Funny was a segment where Kathie Lee shares jokes and puns during the Today's Talk.
Give It Away was a segment where prizes are given to 5 viewers.
Favorite Things was a segment where Kathie Lee and Hoda share their favorite products.
iHoda was a segment where Hoda shares her favorite song of the moment during Today's Talk.
Who Knew? is a trivia game that is partially taped live across the street at The Shop at NBC Studios.

Awards and nominations

References

External links
 

2000s American television news shows
2010s American television news shows
2020s American television news shows
Television morning shows in the United States
English-language television shows
American live television series
NBC original programming
NBC News
Today (American TV program)
Television shows filmed in New York City